Zalinski is a surname. Notable people with the surname include:

Edmund Zalinski (1849–1909), Polish-born American soldier, military engineer, and inventor
Henryk Żaliński (born 1938), Polish historian
Wojciech Żaliński (born 1988), Polish volleyball player